Olivier Aurenche is a French archaeologist working in the prehistory of the Levant and Near East.

References

External links
 http://www.archeorient.mom.fr/annuaire/aurenche-olivier Presentation page

French archaeologists
Living people
Year of birth missing (living people)